Fox House is a historic home located at Lexington, Lexington County, South Carolina, USA. It was built circa 1832, and is a two-story frame dwelling with an 11-foot deep porch across the front façade. The house is attached by breezeways to two dependencies, which are currently interpreted as a kitchen and the quarters for enslaved workers. These dependencies were originally both slave quarters that were not attached to the main house. The house was probably constructed for Jesse Bates but was purchased in 1843 by John Fox who was the county sheriff, clerk of court and a state senator. It became a part of the Lexington County Museum in 1970.

It was listed on the National Register of Historic Places in 1970.

References

Houses on the National Register of Historic Places in South Carolina
Houses completed in 1830
Houses in Lexington County, South Carolina
National Register of Historic Places in Lexington County, South Carolina
1830 establishments in South Carolina
Slave cabins and quarters in the United States